The original building for the University College of North Wales is a Grade I listed University building in the Collegiate Tudor style with Arts and Crafts influences. Designed by architect Henry Hare it was completed in 1911. The listed building record states that it is architecturally, one of the most significant public buildings of the period in Britain.

The building dominates the views of Bangor in Gwynedd, North Wales.  Its highly visible location above the town meant that it became known, in Welsh as "Y Coleg ar y Bryn" (the College on the hill). The building contains the principal administrative areas of the university, in addition to the library, and the large Pritchard-Jones hall, named after Sir John Pritchard Jones.

History 
While the University of North Wales (now called Bangor University) was founded in 1884, it was initially based in a former coaching inn, the Penrhyn Arms hotel as there 

were less than 58 students and 12 teaching staff. As the university expanded however, a more significant base was required and construction of the current building began in 1907, its foundation stone was laid by King Edward VII. The architect selected for the job was Henry T Hare from London, following a competition assessed by Sir Aston Webb. University staff, most prominently Isambard Owen, modified the designs and the contractors used were Messrs Thornton & Sons from Liverpool. The total cost of the project was £175,000, and the building was formally opened in 1911 by King George V. A modern extension was added along the road side of the building in 1969. The university of North Wales became the foremost pioneer of the academic development of the Welsh language, which is one of the reasons the building was listed in 1949.

Architecture 
The building is built around two courtyards, the larger of which was left open initially but was later enclosed by the extensions built by Sir Percy Thomas between 1966 and 1970. The entire structure is linked together and focuses upon a central tower similar to that of a cathedral. The main courses are made from Cefn stone with freestone dressings and flat buttresses; and the slate roofs include a parapet and stone chimney stacks. Inside, the grandest room is the council chamber, decorated 

with Jacobean panelling, a vaulted ceiling, and the heraldry of the Welsh Princes. The same floor also contains the porcelain museum.

References 

Grade I listed buildings in Gwynedd
Bangor University